In the Hebrew Bible, Hosea ( or ;  – Hōšēaʿ, 'Salvation';  – Hōsēé), also known as Osee, son of Beeri, was an 8th-century BCE prophet in Israel and the nominal primary author of the Book of Hosea. He is the first of the Twelve Minor Prophets, whose collective writings were aggregated and organized into a single book in the Jewish Tanakh by the Second Temple period, forming the last book of the Nevi'im; but which writings are distinguished as individual books in Christianity.  Hosea is often seen as a "prophet of doom", but underneath his message of destruction is a promise of restoration. The Talmud claims that he was the greatest prophet of his generation. The period of Hosea's ministry extended to some sixty years, and he was the only prophet of Israel of his time who left any written prophecy.

Name
The name Hosea (meaning 'salvation', 'he saves' or 'he helps'), seems to have been common, being derived from a related verb meaning salvation. Numbers 13:16 states that Hosea was the original name of Joshua, son of Nun until Moses gave him the longer, theophoric name Yehoshua incorporating an abbreviated form of the Tetragrammaton. Rashi explains in Sotah 34b that Joshua is a compound name of יה (Yah) and הושע (Hosea, "God may save").

Location
Although it is not expressly stated in the Book of Hosea, it is apparent from the level of detail and familiarity focused on northern geography, that Hosea conducted his prophetic ministries in the northern Kingdom of Israel, of which he was a native. In Hosea 5:8 ff., there seems to be a reference to the Syro-Ephraimite War which led to the capture of the kingdom by the Assyrians (c. ). Hosea's long ministry, from the reign of Jeroboam II (787–747) to the reign of Hoshea (731–722), seems to have ended before the fall of Samaria in 722/721.

Family
Little is known about the life or social status of Hosea. According to the Book of Hosea, he married Gomer, the daughter of Diblaim, but she proved to be unfaithful. Hosea knew she would be unfaithful, as God says this to him immediately in the opening statements of the book. This marriage was arranged in order to serve to the prophet as a symbol of Israel's unfaithfulness to the Lord. His marriage will dramatize the breakdown in the relationship between God and His people Israel. Hosea's family life reflected the "adulterous" relationship which Israel had built with other gods.

Similarly, his children's names represent God's estrangement from Israel. They are prophetic of the fall of the ruling dynasty and the severed covenant with God – much like the prophet Isaiah a generation later. The name of Hosea's daughter, Lo-ruhamah, which translates as 'not pitied', is chosen as a sign of displeasure with the people of Israel for following false gods. The name of Hosea's son, Lo-ammi, which translates as 'not my people', is chosen as a sign of the Lord's displeasure with the people of Israel for following those false gods.

Christian thought
One of the early writing prophets, Hosea used his own experience as a symbolic representation of God and Israel. The relationship between Hosea and Gomer parallels the relationship between God and Israel. Even though Gomer runs away from Hosea and sleeps with another man, he loves her anyway and forgives her. Likewise, even though the people of Israel worshipped false gods, God continued to love them and did not abandon his covenant with them.

The Book of Hosea was a severe warning to the northern kingdom against the growing idolatry being practiced there;  the book was a dramatic call to repentance. Christians extend the analogy of Hosea to Christ and the church: Christ the husband, his church the bride. Christians see in this book a comparable call to the church not to forsake the Lord Jesus Christ. Christians also take the buying back of Gomer as the redemptive qualities of Jesus Christ's sacrifice on the cross.

Other preachers, like Charles Spurgeon, saw Hosea as a striking presentation of the mercy of God in his sermon on Hosea 1:7 titled The LORD's Own Salvation. “But I will have mercy upon the house of Judah, and will save them by the Lord their God, and will not save them by bow, nor by sword, nor by battle, by horses, nor by horsemen.” – Bible, Hosea 1:7

Islamic literature
The Qur'an mentions only some prophets by name but makes it clear that many were sent who are not mentioned. Therefore, many Muslim scholars, such as Ibn Ishaq, speak of Hosea as one of the true Hebrew prophets of Israel. The Book of Hosea has also been used in Qur'anic exegesis by Abdullah Yusuf Ali, especially in reference to Qur'anic verses which speak of the backsliding of Israel.

Observances
He is commemorated with the other Minor prophets in the Calendar of saints of the Armenian Apostolic Church on July 31. He is commemorated on the Eastern Orthodox liturgical calendar, with a feast day on October 17 (for those churches which follow the Julian Calendar, October 17 currently falls on October 30 of the modern Gregorian Calendar). He is also commemorated on the Sunday of the Holy Fathers (the Sunday before the Nativity of the Lord).

Several haftarot are taken from Hosea, including those for Vayetze, Vayishlach, Bamidbar, Naso, Shabbat Shuvah, and (Sephardic only) Tisha B'Av.

Tomb of Hosea

Jewish tradition holds that the tomb of Hosea is a structure located in the Jewish cemetery of Safed; however, Emil G. Hirsch and Victor Ryssel, writing in The Jewish Encyclopedia, say that this tradition is "historically worthless".

In popular culture 
Hosea is retold in a modern-day setting by Ryan Daniel Dobson (director) in the film HOSEA (feature film, 2020)

Hosea is portrayed by Elijah Alexander in the film Amazing Love: The Story of Hosea (2012).

References

External links

Prophet Hosea Orthodox icon and synaxarion

8th-century BC people
Christian saints from the Old Testament
Book of Hosea